The Ryong'am Line is an electrified freight-only railway line of the Korean State Railway in Kujang County, North P'yŏngan Province, North Korea, running from Kujang at the junction of the Ch'ŏngnyŏn P'arwŏn, Manp'o, and P'yŏngdŏk Lines, to Ryong'am.

History
Originally named Yongdŭng Line, this line was opened by the Chosen Government Railway on 1 April 1934. Tongryonggul Station,  from Kujang, was closed on 15 June 1944. Given its current name some time after 1950, the line was electrified by 1980.

Route 

A yellow background in the "Distance" box indicates that section of the line is not electrified.

References

 Japanese Government Railways (1937), 鉄道停車場一覧. 昭和12年10月1日現在(The List of the Stations as of 1 October 1937), Kawaguchi Printing Company, Tokyo, p 498

Railway lines in North Korea
Standard gauge railways in North Korea